Guillaume III des Porcellets (1217–1288) was a French knight and lord.

Early life
Guillaume III des Porcellets was born in 1217.

Career
He was a knight.

He was the Lord of parts of Arles, Fos, Martigues. He served as Conseiller d'Etat and Chamberlain to King Charles I of Naples. He served as the Baron of Sicily and Provence.

He was the only Frenchman to survive the Sicilian Vespers of 1282 when France lost Sicily to the rebels.

Personal life
He married Raimonde de Falconis.

Death
He died in 1288.

References

1217 births
1288 deaths
People from Provence
People from Sicily